Lupinus flavoculatus is a species of lupine known by the common name yelloweyes, or yellow-eyed lupine.

Distribution and habitat
It is endemic to California and Nevada, in mountains and plateaus of the Mojave Desert, and in the Inyo Mountains and White Mountains.  The plant grows in the creosote bush scrub and pinyon-juniper woodland  habitats. It can be found in Death Valley National Park.

Description
Each palmate leaf is made up of 7 to 9 leaflets 1 or 2 centimeters long.

The inflorescence is a small, dense spiral of flowers each roughly a centimeter long. The flower is bright to deep blue with a yellowish spot on its banner.

The fruit is a somewhat oval-shaped hairy legume pod no more than a centimeter long. It contains one or two wrinkled seeds.

References

External links
 Calflora Database: Lupinus flavoculatus (Yellow eyed lupine,  Yelloweyes)
Jepson eFlora treatment of Lupinus flavoculatus
UC CalPhotos gallery for Lupinus flavoculatus

flavoculatus
Flora of the California desert regions
Flora of Nevada
Flora of the Great Basin
Natural history of the Mojave Desert
Endemic flora of the United States
Death Valley National Park
Inyo Mountains
White Mountains (California)
Taxa named by Amos Arthur Heller
Flora without expected TNC conservation status